Initialization may refer to:

 Booting, a process that starts computer operating systems
 Initialism, an abbreviation formed using the initial letters of words or word parts
 In computing, formatting a storage medium like a hard disk or memory. Also, making sure a device is available to the operating system.
 Initialization (programming)